Golam Habib Dulal is a Jatiya Party (Ershad) politician and the former Member of Parliament of Kurigram-4.

Career
Dulal was elected to parliament from Kurigram-4 as a Jatiya Party candidate in 2001.

References

Jatiya Party politicians
Living people
8th Jatiya Sangsad members
People from Kurigram District
Year of birth missing (living people)